Gia Lâm station is a railway station in Vietnam, in the north eastern Long Biên District of Hanoi. It serves the city of Hanoi. It is the terminus of the standard-gauge railway linking Vietnam to China, known as the Hanoi–Đồng Đăng railway. The daily train to Nanning (610 km) departs from this station instead of the main Hanoi railway station, which is served only by metre gauge tracks, as does the Beijing–Nanning–Hanoi through train.

References

Railway stations in Hanoi